The Association of Advanced Rabbinical and Talmudic Schools (AARTS) is a faith-based national accreditation association for Rabbinical and Talmudic schools. It is based in New York, NY and is recognized by the Council for Higher Education Accreditation and United States Department of Education.

In the field of Rabbinical and Talmudic education the association sees itself as both a gatekeeper and a historical authority. They aim to hold traditional thought in a modern world through balance of the old and new.

Operations
AARTS is an independently run, non profit organization, made up of experts in the field of Rabbinical and Talmudic training, which set educational standards in the field throughout the country. Both undergraduate and graduate programs are evaluated by the association. All of these programs must meet set standards in education, finance and graduate requirements in order to be considered for accreditation.

Compared
Since AARTS meets Council for Higher Education Accreditation and United States Department of Education recognition criteria, AARTS standards correspond to those of regional accreditors.  AARTS  accreditation, however, does not guarantee regional accreditation and vice versa. Contrary to the principles laid out by the Council for Higher Education Accreditation in Transfer and the Public Interest: A Statement to the Community, many regionally accredited institutions continue to base transfer credit decisions solely or primarily upon regional accreditation.

See also
 List of Jewish universities and colleges in the United States
 List of recognized accreditation associations of higher learning
 School accreditation
 Bachelor of Talmudic Law
 Master of Rabbinic Studies

References

Jewish universities and colleges in the United States
Orthodox Jewish universities and colleges
Orthodox yeshivas in New York City
School accreditors